The Party of Democratic Socialism (PDS) is a political party in West Bengal in India. The PDS was founded in February 2001 by former Communist Party of India (Marxist) leaders Saifuddin Choudhury and Samir Putatundu. The PDS was in opposition to the Left Front government in West Bengal.

History
The PDS was founded by Saifuddin Chaudhury on 21 February 2001. Samir Putatunda, who had been expelled from CPI(M), joined the new party.

Alliances
Initially there was speculation that the PDS would joint with the All India Trinamool Congress, or else that it would be a constituent of an anti-CPI(M) mahajot (broad front), but the link between Trinamool and the Hindu rightist Bharatiya Janata Party hindered such a development.

The PDS has formed relations with other pro-Congress leftist outfits, such as the Communist Marxist Party in Kerala and the United Communist Party of India. PDS participates in the Confederation of Indian Communists and Democratic Socialists.

Elections
Ahead of the West Bengal state assembly elections in 2001, the PDS had launched their own front. The PDS put up 98 candidates, who together got 219,082 votes (0.6% of the votes in the state). None of their candidates were elected.
Ahead of the Lok Sabha elections in 2004, the PDS had joined hands with Congress, and put up two candidates supported by Congress.

Organisation
The flag of the PDS is a red flag with a red star in a white circle. 
The president of the PDS is Saifuddin Chaudhury, the general secretary is Samir Putatundu (formerly the CPI(M) South 24 Paraganas district secretary), and the treasurer is Subir Chaudhury.

The women's organization of the PDS is called Paschim Banga Nari Sanghati Samiti (West Bengal Women's United Association). The president of PBNSS is Kishwar Jahan.
The PDS publishes Natun Path (New Way).

References

External links
 Party of Democratic Socialism
 Yechury blasts CPI-M dissidents
 Cong offers two seats to Communist Confederation
Political parties in West Bengal
Communist Party of India (Marxist) breakaway groups
2001 establishments in West Bengal
Political parties established in 2001
Democratic socialist parties in Asia
Secularist organizations